Barbus sperchiensis is a disputed species of cyprinid fish in the genus Barbus. It is a freshwater fish endemic to the Sperchios river complex, Central Greece.

It is sometimes included in B. cyclolepis.

References 

 

sprechiensis
Cyprinid fish of Europe
Fauna of Greece
Fish described in 1950
Taxa named by Alexander I. Stephanidis